Protein-glutamine gamma-glutamyltransferase 4 is an enzyme that in humans is encoded by the TGM4 gene.

References

Further reading